The 1995 Open Gaz de France was a women's tennis tournament played on indoor carpet courts at the Stade Pierre de Coubertin in Paris, France, that was part of Tier II of the 1995 WTA Tour. It was the third edition of the tournament and was held from 14 February until 18 February 1995. First-seeded Steffi Graf won the singles title and earned $79,000 first-prize money.

Finals

Singles

 Steffi Graf defeated  Mary Pierce 6–2, 6–2
 It was Graf's 1st singles title of the year and the 87th of her career.

Doubles

 Meredith McGrath /  Larisa Savchenko defeated  Manon Bollegraf /  Rennae Stubbs 6–4, 6–1
 It was McGrath's 1st title of the year and the 19th of her career. It was Savchenko's 1st title of the year and the 52nd of her career.

References

External links
 ITF tournament edition profile
 Tournament draws

Open Gaz de France
Open GDF Suez
Open Gaz de France
Open Gaz de France
Open Gaz de France